Environmental pricing reform (EPR) or Ecological fiscal reform (EFR) is a fiscal policy of adjusting market prices to account for environmental costs and benefits; this is accomplished by the utilization of any forms of taxation or subsidy to incentivize or disincentivize practices with environmental impacts.

An externality (a type of market failure) exists where a market price omits environmental costs and/or benefits. In such a situation, rational (self-interested) economic decisions can lead to environmental harm, as well as to economic distortions and inefficiencies.

Environmental pricing reform can be economy-wide, or more focused (e.g. specific to a sector (such as electric power generation or mining) or a particular environmental issue (such as climate change). A "market-based instrument" or "economic instrument for environmental protection" is an individual instance of Environmental Pricing Reform. Examples include green tax-shifting (ecotaxation), tradeable pollution permits, or the subsidization of markets for ecological services.

See also
Ecotax
Environmental accounting
Environmental economics
Environmental enterprise
Environmental finance

References

External links
 Redefining Progress
 Sustainable Prosperity
 Green Budget Germany
 OECD/EEA database on instruments used for environmental policy and natural resources management

Economy and the environment
Market-based environmental policy instruments